Leonard Louis Alvarado (February 13, 1947 – August 12, 1969) was a U.S. Army posthumous recipient of the Medal of Honor during the Vietnam War.

Alvarado joined the Army in 1968, and served as a specialist four. While on an exercise to rescue a trapped American platoon in Phuoc Long Province, Alvarado's company was attacked by the besiegers, and it was pinned down. Alvarado was wounded several times, but took out several enemy gun positions. While in the process of covering suppressing fire, Alvarado died of his wounds. He was awarded a posthumous Medal of Honor in 2014.

Biography
Alvarado was born in Bakersfield, California on Feb. 13, 1947, and enlisted in the U. S. Army on July 25, 1968, serving in the Vietnam War. He was killed in action, leaving behind his wife and a young daughter.

Medal of Honor

Alvarado distinguished himself on Aug. 12, 1969, while serving as a rifleman during a mission to relieve a sister platoon, in Phuoc Long Province, Vietnam. Alvarado was killed in action after disrupting an enemy raid and saving the lives of several comrades.

Alvarado's daughter Lenora accepted the Medal of Honor on his behalf from President Barack Obama in a March 18, 2014 White House ceremony.

The award came through the Defense Authorization Act which called for a review of Jewish American and Hispanic American veterans from World War II, the Korean War and the Vietnam War to ensure that no prejudice was shown to those deserving the Medal of Honor.

Medal of Honor Citation
For conspicuous gallantry and intrepidity at the risk of his life above and beyond the call of duty:

Specialist Four Leonard L. Alvarado distinguished himself by acts of gallantry and intrepidity above and beyond the call of duty while serving as a Rifleman with Company D, 2d Battalion, 12th Cavalry, 1st Cavalry Division (Airmobile) during combat operations against an armed enemy in Phuoc Long Province, Republic of Vietnam on August 12, 1969. On that day, as Specialist Four Alvarado and a small reaction force moved through dense jungle en route to a beleaguered friendly platoon, Specialist Four Alvarado detected enemy movement and opened fire. Despite his quick reaction, Specialist Four Alvarado and his comrades were soon pinned down by the hostile force that blocked the path to the trapped platoon. Specialist Four Alvarado quickly moved forward through the hostile machinegun fire in order to engage the enemy troops. Suddenly, an enemy grenade exploded nearby, wounding and momentarily stunning him. Retaliating immediately, he killed the grenadier just as another enemy barrage wounded him again. Specialist Four Alvarado crawled forward through the fusillade to pull several comrades back within the hastily-formed perimeter. Realizing his element needed to break away from the hostile force, Specialist Four Alvarado began maneuvering forward alone. Though repeatedly thrown to the ground by exploding satchel charges, he continued advancing and firing, silencing several emplacements, including one enemy machinegun position. From his dangerous forward position, he persistently laid suppressive fire on the hostile forces, and after the enemy troops had broken contact, his comrades discovered that he had succumbed to his wounds. Specialist Four Alvarado's extraordinary heroism and selflessness at the cost of his own life, above and beyond the call of duty, are in keeping with the highest traditions of military service and reflect great credit upon himself, his unit and the United States Army.

Other awards and decorations
In addition to the Medal of Honor, Alvarado received the Bronze Star Medal, Purple Heart, Air Medal, Army Commendation Medal with "V" Device, Army Good Conduct Medal, National Defense Service Medal, Vietnam Service Medal with three Bronze Service Stars, Republic of Vietnam Campaign Medal with "60" Device, Valorous Unit Award, Republic of Vietnam Gallantry Cross Unit Citation with Palm Device, Republic of Vietnam Civil Actions Honor Medal Unit Citation First Class, Combat Infantryman Badge and the Expert Marksmanship Badge with Rifle, Auto Rifle and Machine-Gun Bars.

See also
List of Medal of Honor recipients for the Vietnam War

References

1947 births
1968 deaths
American military personnel killed in the Vietnam War
People from Bakersfield, California
Recipients of the Air Medal
United States Army Medal of Honor recipients
United States Army soldiers
Vietnam War recipients of the Medal of Honor
United States Army personnel of the Vietnam War